The 1991 Wake Forest Demon Deacons football team was an American football team that represented Wake Forest University during the 1991 NCAA Division I-A football season. In their fifth season under head coach Bill Dooley, the Demon Deacons compiled a 3–8 record and finished in last place in the Atlantic Coast Conference.

Schedule

Team leaders

References

Wake Forest
Wake Forest Demon Deacons football seasons
Wake Forest Demon Deacons football